The McDonnell Doodlebug is a light aircraft that was built to win a 1927 safety contest by McDonnell Aircraft founder, James Smith McDonnell.

Design and development
The Doodlebug was built in response to a 1927 safety contest sponsored by the Daniel Guggenhiem Fund for the Promotion of Aeronautics with a prize of $100,000. The aircraft was built at the Hamilton Aero Manufacturing factory in Milwaukee, Wisconsin.
l
The Doodlebug is a tandem-seat low wing taildragger with a fabric covered steel tube fuselage. The landing gear featured widely spaced main wheels. The wings featured full-length leading-edge slats.

Operational history
The Doodlebug was produced too late to compete, but was granted an exemption. The aircraft's tail folded upward in initial demonstrations at Mitchel Field in New York, and allowed more extensions to repair damages. After a forced landing due to engine failure, the Doodlebug missed the opportunity to be judged in the competition. The winner of the competition was a Curtiss Tanager. The forced landing caused McDonnell a back injury, but he still drove the aircraft to demonstrate in various air shows throughout the start of the Great Depression. In 1931 the Doodlebug was sold to the National Advisory Committee for Aeronautics (NACA) as a demonstrator for leading edge slats.

Specifications (McDonnell Doodlebug)

References

External links

1920s United States experimental aircraft
Single-engined tractor aircraft
Low-wing aircraft
Aircraft first flown in 1929